Clement Ivanov (born March 6, 1990), better known as Puppey, is an Estonian professional Dota 2 player for Team Secret. He is the founding member of Team Secret. Together with Natus Vincere, Puppey won The International 2011 in August 2011 for a one million dollar first place prize. They also took runner-up for the next two Internationals.

Dota 
Puppey began his esports career in 2007, joining team Xero Skill. Puppey had a successful DotA career playing for top teams, such as KingSurf.international, Nirvana.international, and Team Na'Vi. His final Dota LAN match was a win with Na'Vi at ASUS OPEN Summer 2011.

Dota 2

With Natus Vincere 
Puppey started his first steps into the DotA 2 competitive scene with Natus Vincere among players such as Dendi and Artstyle, as they competed in The International 2011. They went undefeated throughout the whole tournament, winning the then-big US$1,000,000 grand prize. They also won the Electronic Sports World Cup 2011 and took home US$12,000. In both of these tournaments, he demonstrated fantastic prediction with the hero Chen's ability to send his teammates back to base. Puppey became Natus Vincere's Captain after ArtStyle's departure from the team in October 2011.

After winning those two tournaments, Puppey went on to have a place on the podium for 31 out of 32 different tournaments in from 2011 to 2013, winning tournaments such as the Alienware cup, StarLadder Star Series Season 7 and The Defense Season 4. He also achieved second place in The International 2012.

After winning the Dota 2 Champions League Season 2 in 2014, things began to go south for Puppey, getting a 7-8th place at The International 2014, Puppey suddenly left Natus Vincere with Kuroky. The community started saying rumors about why he would leave a team he stayed with for four years.

With Team Secret 
After a loss in a series against Alliance, Puppey and his new team consisting of him, Fly, N0tail, KuroKy and s4, went on to achieve second place in their first tournament Starladder Season 10.

Following his first achievement with Team Secret, Puppey went on to be top 3 on 7 major tournaments and 1 premier tournament. He also won a 'Double Trouble' season with his manager, Matthew 'Cyborgmatt' Bailey. The Double Trouble tournament included a team of two major DotA 2 personalities who battled against other groups of two of the major Dota 2 personalities.

His first major achievement with Team Secret was when the team won US$120,000 in ESL One Frankfurt which included teams such as Alliance, Evil Geniuses, Cloud9, and Invictus Gaming.

Team Secret went into The International 2015 as heavy favorites, but left only with a tie for 7-8 place and US$830,000.

Following TI5, the team underwent heavy drama between Kuro 'KuroKy' S. Takhasomi and Artour 'Arteezy' Babaev, which started with Arteezy indirectly blaming the loss at The International on KuroKy while streaming on Twitch and KuroKy responding and flaming Arteezy in German forums.

In the post-TI5 shuffle, s4 and Arteezy returned to their previous teams, Zai decided to leave competitive DOTA to finish school, and KuroKy formed a new German team 5Jungz (which will later be sponsored by Team Liquid). On August 22, team director Kemal Sadikoglu announced the new roster of Team Secret which now included MiSery, EternaLEnVy, w33, pieliedie and of course Puppey

Following the new roster change, Puppey and his team went on to achieve second place in The Frankfurt Major and ESL One New York while winning Nanyang DotA 2 Championships and the MLG World Finals 2015.

Puppey and Team Secret won Shanghai Major 2016 in March 2015 after beating Team Liquid in the finals.

Puppey and Team Secret eliminated by Team Empire, 1:2, during the ESL One Manila 2016 group B decider series. After a rocky start in day one of the tournament, Team Secret made an incredible comeback beating EHOME 2 – 0 in their Best of 3 series.

Controversies 
On 16 February 2016, former team manager Evany Chang accused Team Secret of not paying prize winnings to her and former players. On 9 October 2016, former player EternaLEnVy wrote a blog post detailing several instances of the organisation, in particular team director Kemal and Puppey, failing to pay players on time, lying about payments and sponsorships, and taking a 10% cut out of prize winnings without informing the players. Later that day, another former player, MiSeRy, released a blog raising similar issues, and claiming Secret did not pay him until he asked several times. He also backed EternaLEnVy's claim that Puppey was the only player aware of the organization taking a 10% cut.

References

External links 

Dota players
Living people
Estonian esports players
Team Secret players
1990 births
Natus Vincere players